Moncef or Munsif is a masculine Arabic given name. People named Moncef include:

 Moncef Slaoui, American researcher 
 Moncef Belkhayat, Moroccan politician
 Moncef Guitouni, Tunisian psycho-sociologist 
 Moncef Marzouki, fourth President of Tunisia
 Moncef Ouichaoui, Algerian footballer

Arabic masculine given names